Tang Wong is a 2013 Thai indie coming-of-age drama film directed by Kongdej Jaturanrasmee. It tells the story of a group of secondary school students struggling to learn a traditional dance as an offering for the local spirit shrine, which takes place against the backdrop of the 2010 Thai political crisis. The film won the Best Film, Best Director, Best Screenplay and Best Supporting Actor awards at the 2013 Thailand National Film Association Awards.

References

External links

Thai coming-of-age films
Thai-language films
2013 films
Best Picture Suphannahong National Film Award winners
2010s coming-of-age films